Castaway Bay is a themed area at the Sea World theme park on the Gold Coast, Queensland, Australia. It consists of four distinct attractions: Battle Boats (formerly Battle Sails), Sky Climb, Sky Fortress and The Reef.

History
In December 2009, a Gold Coast Bulletin article reported Sea World would be receiving a multimillion-dollar, water-related family attraction in 2010. In May 2010, Sea World confirmed they would launch a A$6 million interactive adventure zone. One month later, the park announced that Castaway Bay would comprise Battle Sails, Sky Climb and Sky Fortress. They also stated that it would be open by Summer 2010. Prior to official launch, the ride Battle Sails was renamed to Battle Boats. On 18 September 2010, Castaway Bay officially opened to the public. In December 2017, a new splash zone expansion to Castaway Bay named The Reef was opened for the Summer school holiday season.

Attractions

Castaway Bay features attractions provided by Mack Rides and Prime Interactives, combined with theming by Sculpt Studios.

Battle Boats
Battle Boats is a shipwreck-themed Splash Battle (water battle attraction) where riders board one of eight boats which move around a track. Riders must shoot at the other boats and can receive fire from up to 80 other water guns located around the course. The ride is an ideal family attraction despite the restriction that guests under  must be accompanied by an adult who is 14 years or older. The ride is a Splash Battle, an interactive boat ride manufactured by Mack Rides.

Sky Climb
Any guests under  must be accompanied by an adult who is 14 years or older. The attraction is a Sky Trail Ropes Course manufactured by Prime Interactives.

Sky Fortress
Sky Fortress is a 5-storey adventure playground featuring a variety of rope bridges and tunnels. All guests who weigh less than  can participate in this attraction. The attraction is an Adventure Trail manufactured by Prime Interactives.

The Reef 
The Reef is a splash zone expansion to Castaway Bay which opened in December 2017. It is equipped with over 80 water canons, spouts and interactive character sculptures. The area is zero level meaning there is no pools. The area is fully wheelchair accessible and disability friendly.

References

External links
 

Amusement rides introduced in 2010